The Fallon Company is a privately held commercial real estate owner and developer headquartered in Boston, Massachusetts. Founded by Joseph F. Fallon in 1993, The Fallon Company has developed over $6 billion in real estate, representing more than six million square feet of property. The company is recognized as a leader in mixed-use urban development and one of the most active private developers on the East Coast. The company focuses on large-scale urban design geared toward transforming neighborhoods into cohesive, community-driven environments. With offices in Boston, Charlotte, Raleigh, and Nashville, The Fallon Company has the capacity and resources to undertake projects throughout the United States.

Executive Team 
 Joseph F. Fallon - Chairman
 Michael Fallon - Chief Executive Officer
 Brian Awe - President

Projects 

 Boston, MA
, the Fallon Company is developing Boston's Fan Pier, as part of the South Boston waterfront redevelopment. Fan Pier is a 21-acre, nine city block site which consisted largely of underutilized parking lots when the Fallon Company purchased it for $115 million in 2005. Today, it is a neighborhood comprising four commercial towers: One Marina Park Drive, 11 Fan Pier Boulevard, 50 Northern Avenue, and 100 Northern Avenue; and two luxury condominium towers: Twenty Two Liberty and Fifty Liberty. Two more high-rise towers are planned. When complete in 2020, the $4 billion Fan Pier project will encompass three million square feet of commercial and residential real estate, public, civic and cultural space, including two parks and a 6-acre marina.

 Charlotte, NC
In 2016, The Fallon Company established its Southeast headquarters in Charlotte, North Carolina. Shortly thereafter, Horizon Development Properties selected The Fallon Company as master developer to redevelop the 16.2-acre Strawn Cottages site in the Dilworth neighborhood of Charlotte. The Fallon Company is leading the $330 million mixed-use and mixed-income project known as Centre South, a property bounded by South Boulevard, Templeton Avenue and Euclid Avenue. When built out, the redevelopment will feature a 1.6-acre expansive green space, 975 mixed-income residential units, 36,000 square feet of retail, a 405,000-square-foot office building and a 180-room hotel.

 Raleigh, NC
In April 2018, The Fallon Company acquired an assemblage of parcels in the heart of downtown Raleigh, North Carolina. The project, named Raleigh Crossing, is located at the intersection of Raleigh’s downtown districts.

Delivered in 2022, the first phase of the development, 301 Hillsborough is a high-end office building. The tower features 280,000 square feet of office space, an amenity level, wide pedestrian-friendly sidewalks, retail, and a double-height lobby. When completed, Raleigh Crossing will include 18,000 square feet of retail and over 250 residential units, in addition to the office tower.

References

External links
 Fallon Company corporate website

Real estate companies of the United States
Companies based in Boston